Geovânio Bonfim Sobrinho (born 13 March 1963), commonly known as Wando, is a Brazilian retired professional footballer who played as a left winger.

Over nine seasons, he amassed Primeira Liga totals of 225 matches and 26 goals, mainly with Benfica.

Club career
Born in Rio de Janeiro, Wando arrived in Portugal at only 19 and started playing for S.C. Braga. After two solid seasons in Minho, he signed with fellow Primeira Liga club S.L. Benfica, becoming an important attacking weapon as the latter won one league (1987), three cups (1985 to 1987) and one supercup (1985).

After four seasons being regularly used, whether as a starter or substitute, and with competitive totals of 139 games and 23 goals, Wando left Benfica and played three more years in the country – always in the top division – with Vitória de Setúbal and C.S. Marítimo (two seasons). He retired in 1994 at 31, after spells with Turkish side Konyaspor and Esporte Clube XV de Novembro (Jaú) back in his home country.

References

External links

1963 births
Living people
Footballers from Rio de Janeiro (city)
Brazilian footballers
Association football wingers
Esporte Clube XV de Novembro (Jaú) players
Primeira Liga players
S.C. Braga players
S.L. Benfica footballers
Vitória F.C. players
C.S. Marítimo players
Süper Lig players
Konyaspor footballers
Brazilian expatriate footballers
Expatriate footballers in Portugal
Expatriate footballers in Turkey
Brazilian expatriate sportspeople in Portugal
Brazilian expatriate sportspeople in Turkey